The third season of the animated television series Johnny Test premiered on September 22, 2007 with "Johnny vs. Bling-Bling 3" and "Stinkin' Johnny" and ended on March 1, 2008 with episodes "Johnny X: A New Beginning" and "Johnny X: The Final Ending". As of this season, Cookie Jar Entertainment and for the final time (due to shutting down in 2008) Collideascope Animation Studios, worked on the show.

This season, along with the fourth season, was released on DVD in a bundle on September 13, 2011 in Region 1. This would be the final season that the show would air on the Kids' WB block.

Cast
 James Arnold Taylor as Johnny Test
 Louis Chirillo as Dukey
 Ashleigh Ball as Mary Test
 Maryke Hendrikse as Susan Test

Episodes

All episodes in this season were directed by Larry Jacobs.
</onlyinclude>

References 

2007 American television seasons
2008 American television seasons
Johnny Test seasons
2007 Canadian television seasons
2008 Canadian television seasons